Lethal Weapon is an American buddy cop action comedy-drama television series that is based on the film series of the same name created by Shane Black. The series stars Damon Wayans as Roger Murtaugh, a senior Los Angeles Police Department detective who returns to the force, after recovering from a heart attack, and is partnered with Texas transfer Martin Riggs, played by Clayne Crawford. Riggs, a Navy SEAL-turned-police officer from El Paso, Texas, moves to Los Angeles after the death of his wife and unborn child, transferring from the El Paso County Sheriff's Office to the LAPD's Robbery-Homicide Division.

The series was ordered in May 2016 and premiered on Fox on September 21. The series was renewed for a 15-episode third season, with Seann William Scott replacing Clayne Crawford as the series' co-lead, playing new character Wesley Cole.

Series overview

Episodes

Season 1 (2016–17)

Season 2 (2017–18)

Season 3 (2018–19)

Ratings

Season 1

Season 2

Season 3

References

External links

Lists of American comedy-drama television series episodes
Lists of American crime drama television series episodes